Sanja Štiglic (born 10 March 1970) is a Slovenian civil servant, diplomat and politician, and a former President of the UNICEF Executive Board at the international level.

She served as Slovenia's ambassador to the United Nations in New York from 2007 to 2012, and as President of the UNICEF Executive Board in 2011. In 2016 she became director-general of the Directorate for Multilateral Affairs, Development Cooperation and International Law, and in the same year, she was appointed state secretary at the Foreign Ministry.

She was under-secretary in 2003 and 2004 and advisor to the foreign minister in 1996 and 1997.

References

Slovenian diplomats
Chairmen and Presidents of UNICEF
Slovenian women diplomats
1970 births
Living people
Slovenian officials of the United Nations